Rochelle Municipal Airport , also known as Koritz Field, is a city-owned public-use airport located two nautical miles (2.3 mi, 3.7 km) south of the central business district of Rochelle, a city in Ogle County, Illinois, United States. It is included in the FAA's National Plan of Integrated Airport Systems for 2011–2015, which categorized it as a general aviation facility.

Although many U.S. airports use the same three-letter location identifier for the FAA and IATA, this facility is assigned RPJ by the FAA but has no designation from the IATA.

In 2022, the airport was home to an exhibit of old cars and aircraft to highlight the city's history with transportation development.

Facilities and aircraft 
It has one runway designated 7/25 with an asphalt surface measuring 4,225 by 75 feet (1,288 x 23 m).

For the 12-month period ending August 31, 2021, the airport had 12,000 general aviation aircraft operations, an average of 33 per day. At that time there were 42 aircraft based at this airport: 32 single-engine, 9 ultralights, and 1 multi-engine.

The airport received funds from the State of Illinois for facility upgrades during the Covid-19 pandemic.

References

External links 
 Aerial photo as of 14 April 1998 from USGS The National Map
 Rochelle Municipal Airport website
 

Airports in Illinois
Buildings and structures in Ogle County, Illinois